Thiruppattur (Tirupattur) is a small village in Manachanallur Taluka, Tiruchirappalli district, Tamil Nadu, India. It is 33 km by road north of the city of Tiruchirappalli on the NH-45, the Chennai - Tiruchi highway. It is 18.5 km by road north of the village of Samayapuram, and 15 km by road southwest of Padalur (East).

It is known for the Bramhapureeswarar temple which has a special shrine for Lord Bramha.

Demographics
In the 2001 India census, the village had a population of 2,535, with 1,277 males (50.4%) and 1,258 females (49.6%), for a gender ratio of 985 females per thousand males.

References

Villages in Tiruchirappalli district